Innar is an Estonian masculine given name.

People named Innar include:
Innar Mäesalu (born 1970), politician
Innar Mändoja (born 1978), racing cyclist

References

Estonian masculine given names